The Sino-Korean Friendship Bridge, or China–North Korea Friendship Bridge, is a bridge across the Yalu or Amnok River on the China–North Korea border. It connects the cities of Dandong in China and Sinuiju of North Korea, by railway and roadway but pedestrians are not allowed to cross between either side. The bridge serves as one of the few ways to enter or leave North Korea.

It was renamed to its current name from the Yalu (Amnok) River Bridge in 1990. The bridge was constructed by the Imperial Japanese Army (IJA) between April 1937 and May 1943 during its occupation of Korea and its puppet state of Manchukuo (now northeast China). Further downstream, construction work on the New Yalu River Bridge began in October 2010.

Background and history  
This was later supplemented with the more modern bridge which became operational in 1943. Both bridges were attacked and bombed by American military aircraft throughout most of the Korean War. From November 1950 to February 1951, the United States Air Force (USAF) used B-29 heavy bombers and F-80 fighter-bombers to repeatedly attack and destroy the bridges in an attempt to cut off the flow of Chinese military and troop supplies to the badly weakened North Korean armed forces as well as their own forces fighting alongside them there. Despite the serious difficulties present, the bridges were repeatedly repaired (largely by China). The older bridge from 1911 was left in ruins following its destruction at the hands of the USAF (with North Korea allegedly claiming it would serve as a piece of hard evidence of the US military's destruction of the bridge) and only the newer bridge from 1943 was repaired once again and put back into use at the end of the war in 1953.

Tourism  

The Sino-Korean Friendship Bridge and the Broken Bridge are flanked on the Chinese side by parks and promenades which make up the Yalu (Amnok) River Scenic Area. This is a major tourist attraction in China and is rated AAAA on China's national tourist scale. Tourist boats leave from the side of the bridge, allowing visitors to view both bridges and the Dandong riverfront, and pass close to the North Korean waterfront.

See also 

People's Republic of China – North Korea relations
 Foreign relations of North Korea
 List of bridges in China
 Korea Russia Friendship Bridge
 Friendship Bridge
 New Yalu River Bridge
Other Sino-Korean border bridges:
 Ji'an Yalu River Border Railway Bridge (Ji'an City)
 Linjiang Yalu River Bridge (Linjiang City)
 Changbai-Hyesan International Bridge (Changbai Korean Autonomous County)
 Tumen Border Bridge (Tumen City)
 Tumen River Bridge (Hunchun City)

External links

International bridges
Bridges in North Korea
Bridges in Liaoning
Road-rail bridges
China–North Korea border crossings
Bridges completed in 1943
Buildings and structures in Dandong
AAAA-rated tourist attractions
Yalu River